Habib Benmimoun ((born April 11, 1957 in Oran) is an Algerian former football defender and forward and current head coach. He played essentially for MC Oran.

Honours

Club
MC Oran
Algerian Championship: 1987–88; Runner-up: 1984–85, 1986–87
Algerian Cup: 1983–84, 1984–85

Career statistics

International matches
Below the list of the international matches played by the player.

References

External links 
 Player profile - National-football-teams.com

1959 births
Living people
Algerian footballers
Algeria international footballers
Footballers from Oran
MC Oran players
USM Bel Abbès players
MC Oran managers
Association football defenders
Association football forwards
Algerian football managers
21st-century Algerian people